The 1931 Utah Utes football team was an American football team that represented the University of Utah as a member of the Rocky Mountain Conference (RMC) during the 1931 college football season. Led by seventh-year head coach Ike Armstrong, the Utes compiled an overall record of 7–2 with a mark of 6–0 against conference opponents, winning the RMC title for fourth consecutive season and completing their third consecutive year of perfect conference play. Utah outscored all opponents by a total of 301 to 31.

Schedule

References

Utah
Utah Utes football seasons
Rocky Mountain Athletic Conference football champion seasons
Utah Utes football